Gerini is an Italian surname. Notable people with the surname include:

Claudia Gerini (born 1971), Italian actress
Gerino Gerini (disambiguation), multiple people
Gerolamo Emilio Gerini (1860–1913), Italian diplomat and academic
Marco Gerini (born 1971), Italian water polo player
Niccolò di Pietro Gerini (c. 1340 – 1414), Italian painter

Italian-language surnames